Caledonia, Nova Scotia may refer to:

 Caledonia, Nova Scotia, a village in the northern Region of Queens Municipality
 Caledonia (St. Marys), Nova Scotia, a community in St. Mary's, Nova Scotia
 Caledonia Cape Breton, Nova Scotia, a community in Cape Breton Regional Municipality
 Caledonia Junction, Nova Scotia  a community in Lunenburg County
 Caledonia Mills, Nova Scotia a community in Antigonish County
 Port Caledonia